Helena Louise Morrissey, Baroness Morrissey,  (22 March 1966), is a British financier and campaigner.

Early life
Morrissey was born in Bowdon, Cheshire, in 1966. She grew up in Alverstoke near Portsmouth, and was educated at Bishop Luffa School. Both of her parents were teachers. She studied philosophy at Fitzwilliam College, Cambridge.

Career
Morrissey began her career at the New York and London bond desks at Schroders. Finding her career path blocked there, she moved to Newton Investment Management in the early 1990s as a fixed income fund manager. Morrissey became Newton's chief executive; as of 2015, it manages
£47 billion of assets. Morrissey left Newton Investment Management in 2016. She has been on the board of Legal & General Investment Management and St James's Place. 

In July 2021, Morrissey joined the board of AJ Bell, before becoming chair in January 2022. Morrissey announced in September 2022 that she was resigning as chair of the Board.

All Perspectives Ltd, the company behind the GB News television and radio news channel,
gained the Baroness as a director in November 2022.

Campaigns
In 2010, Morrissey established the 30% Club to campaign for greater female representation on company boards. She is a trustee at the Eve Appeal, which raises money for gynaecological cancers, and she is a former chairperson of the corporate board of the Royal Academy of Arts.

Honours
In 2016, Morrissey was awarded an honorary doctorate by the University of Cambridge.

Morrissey was appointed Commander of the Order of the British Empire (CBE) in the 2012 New Year Honours for services to UK business and promoted Dame Commander of the Order of the British Empire (DBE) in the 2017 Birthday Honours for services to diversity in financial services.

On 3 September 2020, she was created Baroness Morrissey, of Chapel Green in the Royal County of Berkshire. On 28 September 2020, she made her maiden speech in the Lords.

Personal life
Baroness Morrissey and her husband, Richard, a former financial journalist and stay-at-home dad, are the parents of nine children, three boys and six girls, one of whom is musician Flo Morrissey. They met whilst studying at Cambridge and live in Notting Hill, London.

Other activities
Morrissey is the author of a book, A Good Time to be a Girl (Harper Collins, 2018). She was the guest on the BBC Radio 4 programme Desert Island Discs on Sunday 22 March 2020.

Morrissey was criticised in 2021 after she tweeted that there was no current pandemic, and "CCP fake videos started this".

In October 2021 her second book, Style and Substance, a Career Guide for Women who want to Win at Work, was published by Little, Brown Books.

External Links
Profile at Parliament

References

1966 births
Living people
Women chief executives
Money managers
Place of birth missing (living people)
Alumni of Fitzwilliam College, Cambridge
British chief executives
British women business executives
British Eurosceptics
Women in finance
Dames Commander of the Order of the British Empire
People from Chichester
Schroders people
People from Altrincham
People educated at Bishop Luffa School
Conservative Party (UK) life peers
Life peeresses created by Elizabeth II